A peccary (also javelina or skunk pig) is a medium-sized, pig-like hoofed mammal of the family Tayassuidae (New World pigs). They are found throughout Central and South America, Trinidad in the Caribbean, and in the southwestern area of North America. They represent the closest relatives of the family Suidae, which contains pigs and relatives. Together Tayassuidae and Suidae are grouped in the Suina within the Artiodactyla (even toed ungulates).

Peccaries are social creatures that live in herds. They eat roots, grubs, and a variety of foods. They can identify each other by their strong odors. A group of peccaries that travel and live together is called a "squadron". A squadron of peccaries averages between six and nine members.

Peccaries first appeared in North America during the Miocene, and migrated into South America during the Pliocene-Pleistocene as part of the Great American Interchange.

They are often confused with feral domestic pigs, commonly known as "razorback" hogs in many parts of the United States, when the two occur in the wild in similar ranges.

Mayans kept herds of peccaries, using them in rituals and for food. They are kept as pets in many countries, in addition to being raised on farms as a source of food.

Etymology

The word "javelina" derives from the Spanish word for "wild boar". In French Guiana and Suriname, the animal is called pakira.

The scientific name Tayassuidae derives from the same source as the Portuguese .

Characteristics

A peccary is a  medium-sized animal, with a strong resemblance to a pig. Like a pig, it has a snout ending in a cartilaginous disc, and eyes that are small relative to its head. Also like a pig, it uses only the middle two digits for walking, although, unlike pigs, the other toes may be altogether absent. Its stomach is not ruminating, although it has three chambers, and is more complex than those of pigs.

Peccaries are omnivores and will eat insects, grubs, and occasionally small animals, although their preferred foods consist of roots, grasses, seeds, fruit, and cacti—particularly prickly pear. Pigs and peccaries can be differentiated by the shape of the canine tooth, or tusk. In European pigs, the tusk is long and curves around on itself, whereas in peccaries, the tusk is short and straight. The jaws and tusks of peccaries are adapted for crushing hard seeds and slicing into plant roots, and they also use their tusks for defending against predators. The dental formula for peccaries is: 

By rubbing the tusks together, they can make a chattering noise that warns potential predators to stay away. In recent years in northwestern Bolivia near Madidi National Park, large groups of peccaries have been reported to have seriously injured or killed people.

Peccaries are social animals, often forming herds. Over 100 individuals have been recorded for a single herd of white-lipped peccaries, but collared and Chacoan peccaries usually form smaller groups. Such social behavior seems to have been the situation in extinct peccaries, as well. The recently discovered giant peccary (Pecari maximus) of Brazil appears to be less social, primarily living in pairs. Peccaries rely on their social structure to defend territory, protect against predators, regulate temperature, and interact socially.

Peccaries have scent glands below each eye and another on their backs, though these are believed to be rudimentary in P. maximus. They also mark other herd members with these scent glands by rubbing one against another. The pungent odor allows peccaries to recognize other members of their herd, despite their myopic vision. The odor is strong enough to be detected by humans, which earns the peccary the nickname of "skunk pig".

Species

Extant species

Three (possibly four) living species of peccaries are found from the Southwestern United States through Central America and into South America and Trinidad, each in their own genus.
Tayassu
White-lipped peccary (T. pecari)
Catagonus
Chacoan peccary (C. wagneri)
Dicotyles
Collared peccary (D. tajacu)

The collared peccary (Dicotyles tajacu) or "musk hog", referring to the animal's scent glands, occurs from the Southwestern United States into South America and the island of Trinidad. The coat consists of wiry peppered black, gray, and brown hair with a lighter colored "collar" circling the shoulders. They bear young year-round, but most often between November and March, with the average litter size consisting of two to three offspring. They are found in many habitats, from arid scrublands to humid tropical rain forests. The collared peccary is well-adapted to habitat disturbed by humans, merely requiring sufficient cover. They can be found in cities and agricultural land throughout their range. Notable populations exist in the suburbs of Phoenix and Tucson, Arizona, where they feed on ornamental plants and other cultivated vegetation. There are also urban populations as far north as Sedona, Arizona where they have been known to fill a niche similar to raccoons and other urban scavengers. In Arizona they are often called by their Spanish name "javelinas". Collared peccaries are generally found in bands of 8 to 15 animals of various ages. They defend themselves if they feel threatened, but otherwise tend to ignore humans.

A second species, the white-lipped peccary (Tayassu pecari), is mainly found in rainforests of Central and South America, but also known from a wide range of other habitats such as dry forests, grasslands, mangrove, cerrado, and dry xerophytic areas. The two main threats to their survival are deforestation and hunting.

The third species, the Chacoan peccary (Catagonus wagneri). It is found in the dry shrub habitat or Chaco of Paraguay, Bolivia, and Argentina. The Chacoan peccary has the distinction of having been first described based on fossils and was originally thought to be an extinct species. In 1975, the animal was discovered in the Chaco region of Paraguay. The species was well known to the native people.

A fourth as yet unconfirmed species, the giant peccary (Dicotyles maximus), was described from the Brazilian Amazon and north Bolivia by Dutch biologist Marc van Roosmalen. Though relatively recently discovered, it has been known to the local Tupi people as caitetu munde, which means "great peccary which lives in pairs". Its pelage is completely dark gray, with no collars whatsoever. Unlike other peccaries, it lives in pairs, or with one or two offspring. However, the scientific evidence for considering it as a species separate from the collared peccary has later been questioned, leading the IUCN to treat it as a synonym.

During the Late Pleistocene, two extinct peccaries, Mylohyus and Platygonus, were widespread across North America (and in the case of Platygonus, South America), but became extinct at the end of the Pleistocene around 12,000 years ago following the arrival of humans.

Extinct genera
In addition, Tayassuidae have a well-attested fossil record, and numerous extinct genera are known:
 †Aptenohyus
 †Cynorca
 †Egatochoerus
 †Floridachoerus
 †Macrogenis
 †Mckennahyus
 †Mylohyus
 †Platygonus
 †Prochoerus
 †Prosthennops
 †Simojovelhyus
 †Skinnerhyus
 †Thinohyus
 †Woodburnehyus

Evolution

Although some taxa from the Old World like the European Miocene Taucanamo have been suggested to be members of Tayussidae, their assignation to the group is equivocal, with a 2017 phylogenetic analysis recovering Taucanamo outside the clade containing suids and peccaries. The oldest unambiguous fossils of peccaries are from the Early Miocene of North America, with the North American Eocene-Oligocene genus Perchoerus, also often considered an early peccary, recovered outside the clade containing peccaries and suids.

Although common in South America today, peccaries did not reach there until about three million years ago during the Great American Interchange, when the Isthmus of Panama formed, connecting North America and South America. At that time, many North American animals—including peccaries, llamas and tapirs—entered South America, while some South American species, such as the ground sloths and opossums, migrated north. Several species of peccary across the genera Platygonus and Mylohyus remained in North America until their extinction following the colonization of the continent by humans via Beringia at the end of the Pleistocene. Today, 2 of the 3 species are relegated to the Neotropical realm, but the collared peccary ranges into northern Mexico and the southwestern United States.

Domestication

Peccaries bear a superficial resemblance to pigs and are in the same suborder Suina as swine, and have been present in South America since prehistoric times. The earliest scientific description of peccaries in the New World is in Brazil in 1547 and referred to them as "wild pigs".

It has been documented that peccaries were tamed, penned, and raised for food and ritual purposes in the Yucatan, Panama, the southern Caribbean, and Colombia at the time of the Conquest. Archaeological remains of peccaries have been found in Mesoamerica from the Preclassic (or Formative) period up until immediately before Spanish contact. Specifically, peccary remains have been found at Early Formative Olmec civilization sites.

The peccary is not readily suitable for modern captive breeding, lacking suitable characteristics for intensive or semi-intensive systems. Peccaries require a higher age before they are able to give birth (parturition) and have a tendency towards infanticide.

Relation with feral pigs 
Recently established Brazilian boar populations are not to be confused with long-established populations of feral domestic pigs, which have existed mainly in the Pantanal for more than 100 years, along with native peccaries. The demographic dynamics of the interaction between feral pig populations and those of the two native species of peccaries (collared peccary and white-lipped peccary) is obscure and is still being studied. The existence of feral pigs could somewhat ease jaguar predation on peccary populations, as jaguars show a preference for hunting pigs when they are available.

References

External links

 Arizona Game and Fish Department – Living With Javelina
Arizona State Parks and Trails- Javelina

 
Ungulates of Central America
Mammals of South America
Priabonian first appearances
Extant Eocene first appearances
Taxa named by Theodore Sherman Palmer